72 Hours: True Crime is a television program that was broadcast by CBC Television and produced by Kensington Communications Creative Anarchy and Meech Grant Productions.  It focused on crime, specifically on the first 72 hours after a crime is committed, a critical time period for solving it.  Rather than focus on fictional crimes, as do Law & Order and other TV shows elsewhere, True Crime depicted actual crimes that occurred throughout Canada, using dramatic reenactments and documentary-style footage of crime scenes.  The show was broadcast in high-definition television. In 2007, CBC announced that 72 Hours was cancelled when it announced its new fall season.

Episode list

References

External links
CBC Television: 72 Hours program information
Production company
 

2004 Canadian television series debuts
2000s Canadian reality television series
CBC Television original programming
2000s Canadian crime television series